The Nokia N71 is a smartphone announced by Nokia on 2 November 2005 and released in June 2006. It was Nokia's joint-first clamshell smartphone, like the N92 announced on the same day. The N71 runs on Symbian OS v9.1 (S60 3rd Edition).

Features

Features include a 2 megapixel camera, a built-in flash, a front VGA camera to allow real-time video calling, FM radio, Bluetooth, digital music player functionality, comes standard with a full Web browser, and has support for 3D Java games. It also has 3G and a mini-SD card slot for expandable memory.

Other features include its ability to transfer data via W-CDMA 2100, GPRS and EDGE.

Nokia promotes the N71's 2-megapixel digital rear camera as producing high-quality photography and video as well as its music and radio functionality (the phone's multimedia mini-SD card means it can hold up to 2 gigabytes, equating to potentially hundreds of tracks).

According to Nokia its specifications are:
 Battery stand-by max - 216 hours
 Battery talk time max - 240 mins
 SAR rating - 0.38 W/kg.

References

External links 
 Nokia N71 Product Page

Reviews 
 Nokia N71 - Review by Mobile-Review.com
 Nokia N71 - Review by GSM Arena
 Nokia N71 - Review by All About Symbian
 Nokia N71 - Reviews by CNET: Asia and U.K.

Nokia Nseries
Mobile phones introduced in 2005
Mobile phones with infrared transmitter